Daniel Dubois may refer to:

 Daniel Dubois (boxer) (born 1997), British professional boxer
 Daniel Dubois (politician) (born 1952), French politician